Dr. Lajos Halász de Dabas (born around 1861, died 2 September 1940 in Kőbánya, Budapest) was a Hungarian jurist, who served as Crown Prosecutor of Hungary in 1930.

References

 A magyarországi fő-főügyészek (HVG Archívum)

Hungarian jurists
Hungarian nobility
1860s births
1940 deaths
Year of birth uncertain